Rafi Saar (born 25 September 1967) is the current mayor of Kfar Saba.

Background
Rafi Saar was born in and grew up in Kfar Saba. From 1982-1985, he attended the "Katznelson" high school in the city.

In the army, Saar served in the Engineering Corps and later studied at Bar-Ilan University from which he received bachelor degrees in political science and sociology and a Master's degree in business management.

Political activity
Saar served as aide to former Kfar Saba mayor Itzhak Vald and later became General Manager of Kfar Saba Municipality.

In 2008, he ran for head of regional council for Kochav Yair-Tzur Yigal but lost. He served as council member on the opposition.

From 2009-2014, Saar served as General Manager of the municipality of Hod HaSharon.

On October 30, 2018 he ran for mayor of Kfar Saba in the first round against Yossi Sedbon, Zvika Zarfati, Ilai Harsgor Hendin, Hadar Lavi, Yuval Levi and Mirit Shaked Barak and advanced to the second round. On the 13th of November 2018, Saar won the election with %53.2 of the vote against Yossi Sedbon's %46.8.

External links

References

1967 births
Living people
Mayors of places in Israel
People from Kfar Saba
Bar-Ilan University alumni